Rajya Sabha elections were held on various dates in 1981, to elect members of the Rajya Sabha, Indian Parliament's upper chamber.

Elections
Elections were held to elect members from various states.

Members elected
The following members are elected in the elections held in 1981. They are members for the term 1981-1987 and retire in year 1987, except in case of the resignation or death before the term.
The list is incomplete.

State - Member - Party

Bye-elections
The following bye elections were held in the year 1981.

State - Member - Party

 Andhra Pradesh - M R Apparow - INC ( ele  20/03/1981 term till 1984 )
 Andhra Pradesh - K.V.R.S. Balasubba Rao - INC ( ele  20/03/1981 term till 1984 ) 
 Andhra Pradesh - T Chandrashekhar Reddy - INC ( ele  16/09/1981 term till 1984 ) 15/09/1993
 Uttar Pradesh - Ram Pujan Patel  - INC ( ele  16/09/1981 term till 1986 ) 29/12/1984
 Uttar Pradesh - Siv Lal Balmiki  - INC ( ele  16/09/1981 term till 1982 )
 West Bengal - Nepaldev Bhattacharjee  - CPM ( ele   28/09/1981 term till 1982 )
 Maharashtra - Dr V H Salaskar  - INC ( ele  30/11/1981 term till 1982 )

References

1981 elections in India
1981